Corchoropsis is a genus of flowering plants belonging to the family Malvaceae.

Its native range is Temperate Asia.

Species:
 Corchoropsis crenata Siebold & Zucc.

References

Malvaceae
Malvaceae genera